is a town in Taka District, Hyōgo Prefecture, Japan. , the town had an estimated population of 19,589 in 7661 households and a population density of 110 persons per km².

Geography 
Taka is located in central Hyogo Prefecture. Parts of the town are within the borders of the Kasagatayama-Sengamine Prefectural Natural Park.

Neighbouring municipalities 
Hyōgo Prefecture
 Kasai
 Tanba
 Asago
 Nishiwaki
 Ichikawa
 Kamikawa

Demographics
Per Japanese census data, the population of Taka has declined steadily over the 60 years.

History
The area of the modern town of Taka was within ancient Harima Province. In the Edo Period, most of the area was tenryō territory under direct administration of the Tokugawa shogunate. Following the Meiji restoration, the village of Naka, was created within Taka District, Hyōgo. It was elevated to town status on April 1, 1924. The towns of  Kami and Yachiyo were established in 1955 and 1960 respectively through the merger of smaller villages. The three municipalities merged on November 1, 2005 to form the town of Taka.

Government
Taka has a mayor-council form of government with a directly elected mayor and a unicameral town council of 14 members. Taka, together with the city of Nishiwaki, contributes one member to the Hyogo Prefectural Assembly. In terms of national politics, the town is part of Hyōgo 4th district of the lower house of the Diet of Japan.

Economy
The local economy is centered on agriculture. Yamada Nishiki, a brand of rice used for sake production, originated from this area.

Education
Taka has five public elementary schools and three public middle schools operated by the town government and one public high school operated by the Hyōgo Prefectural Department of Education.There is also one private high school. The prefecture also operates one special education school for the handicapped.

Transportation

Railway
 Until April 1, 1990, the town was serviced by the JR West Kajiya Line. Following the closure of  that line, the nearest passenger rail station is Nishiwakishi Station on the JR West Kakogawa Line.

Highway

References

External links

  

Towns in Hyōgo Prefecture
Taka, Hyōgo